Bazedoxifene, used as bazedoxifene acetate, is a medication for bone problems and possibly (pending more study) for cancer. It is a third-generation selective estrogen receptor modulator (SERM). Since late 2013 it has had U.S. FDA approval for bazedoxifene as part of the combination drug Duavee in the prevention (not treatment) of postmenopausal osteoporosis. It is also being studied for possible treatment of breast cancer and pancreatic cancer.

Medical uses
Bazedoxifene is used in the treatment of postmenopausal osteoporosis.

Available forms
Bazedoxifene is marketed both alone and in combination with conjugated estrogens.

Pharmacology

Pharmacodynamics
Bazedoxifene is a selective estrogen receptor modulator (SERM), or a mixed agonist and antagonist of the estrogen receptor (ER) in different tissues.

Chemistry
The drug is a member of the 2-phenylindole group of SERMs, along with zindoxifene and pipendoxifene.

History

Development
Bazedoxifene was developed by Pfizer following the completion of their takeover of Wyeth Pharmaceuticals. It is the result of an exclusive research collaboration between Wyeth Pharmaceuticals and Ligand Pharmaceuticals.

Approval
The drug was approved in the European Union by the European Medicines Agency on April 27, 2009.

On October 3, 2013, the FDA approved the combination product of bazedoxifene 20 mg with 0.45 mg Premarin (conjugated estrogens) for the treatment of menopausal osteoporosis and the treatment of moderate to severe hot flushes. This is the first approved menopausal hormone therapy product that contains a SERM (bazedoxifene) and an estrogen.

Society and culture

Brand names
Bazedoxifene is marketed alone under the brand names Conbriza and Viviant and in combination with conjugated estrogens under the brand names Duavee and Duavive.

See also 
 Bazedoxifene/conjugated estrogens

References 

Azepanes
Indoles
Phenol ethers
Phenols
Selective estrogen receptor degraders
Selective estrogen receptor modulators